Ghost Riders is the sixth studio album by American rock band Outlaws, released on November 22, 1980 through Arista Records. The album lacks the country music influence of the band's previous recordings, instead emphasizing hard rock.

Ghost Riders sparked a comeback after the mediocre sales of prior albums. Their cover of "(Ghost) Riders In the Sky" was one of their most successful songs earned the band some attention outside southern rock circles. Ghost Riders would be the final Outlaws album for Billy Jones, who would be asked to leave the band after its release.

Track listing 
"(Ghost) Riders in the Sky" (Stan Jones) – 5:52
"White Horses" (Salem) – 3:53
"Angels Hide" (Thomasson) – 5:45
"Devil's Road" (Salem) – 4:50
"I Can't Stop Loving You" (Nicholls) – 4:21
"Wishing Wells" (Thomasson) – 3:35
"Sunshine" (Duke, Jones) – 5:38
"Freedom Walk" (Jones) – 5:45

Personnel 
Rick Cua – bass, guitar, vocals
David Dix – percussion, drums
Billy Jones – guitar, vocals
Mike Duke – keyboards, vocals
Freddie Salem – guitar, vocals
Hughie Thomasson – guitar, vocals

Charts 
Album

Singles

References

External links 

Outlaws (band) albums
1980 albums
Arista Records albums